is a United States Coast Guard Cutter and an icebreaking tug.  She is based at Coast Guard Station St. Ignace with a primary area of operation in the Straits of Mackinac including Mackinac Island, Mackinac Bridge, and the northern portions of Lakes Michigan and Huron and occasionally Lakes Superior, Erie and their connecting rivers.  Beyond her role as an icebreaker, Biscayne Bay performs search and rescue and law enforcement functions.

Design
Biscayne Bay is the fourth ship in a class of ice-breaking tugboats designed to have greater multi-mission capabilities than the 110-foot Calumet-class harbor tug (WYTM). The most significant differences include: greater horsepower, greater speed, longer range, increased ice-breaking capability, a hull lubrication system (bubbler), greater degree of automation, and better habitability.

References

External links 
 BISCAYNE BAY Photos and Tour

Bay-class icebreaking tugs
1979 ships
Ships built by Tacoma Boatbuilding Company